"Live, Laugh, Love" is a motivational three-word phrase that became a popular slogan on motivational posters and home decor in the late 2000s and early 2010s. By extension, the saying has also become pejoratively associated with a style of "basic" Generation X decor and with what Vice described as "speaking-to-the-manager shallowness".

The phrase is an abridged form of the 1904 poem "Success" by Bessie Anderson Stanley which begins:

This phrase was subsequently popularized in the Ann Landers and Dear Abby columns, where it was misattributed to Ralph Waldo Emerson. A similar phrase appears in James Joyce's 1939 novel Finnegans Wake:

2010s merchandise

"Live, Laugh, Love" and variants on the phrase have appeared on framed posters, wall decals, ornaments, cushions, mugs, bed linen, jewellery and even on coffins. The Live Love Laugh Foundation, a mental health organization in India founded by Deepika Padukone, takes its name from the phrase.

Vice noted that the trend had largely passed by 2020. Google Trends shows that searches for the phrase peaked between 2009 and 2014 in the United States, falling in popularity since then.

See also
 Keep Calm and Carry On, another motivational phrase that became popular around the same time.

References

Motivation
Internet memes
English phrases
Slogans
2010s fads and trends